Marvin Oliver is a Trinidadian association football player who played professionally in the United States and Trinidad.

On August 5, 1997, Oliver signed with the Staten Island Vipers of the USISL A-League.  In 1998, he was Second Team All League.  In 2000, he moved to the Broward County Wolfpack of the Premier Development League.  In 2002, Oliver played for the Lauderhill Lions in the amateur Gold Coast Soccer League, moving to Uruguay SC of the sam league in 2003.  By 2005, Oliver was in Trinidad with Crab Connection.  He began the 2006 season with the North East Stars, but was back with Crab Connection by the end of the season.  In 2007, Oliver signed with Caledonia AIA before moving to San Juan Jabloteh in 2008.  In 2013, he played for Central FC.

Honors
 1998 Second Team All League

External links
 Socca Warriors: Marvin Oliver

References

Living people
1975 births
TT Pro League players
Morvant Caledonia United players
North East Stars F.C. players
Trinidad and Tobago footballers
Trinidad and Tobago expatriate footballers
San Juan Jabloteh F.C. players
Staten Island Vipers players
Central F.C. players
A-League (1995–2004) players
USL League Two players
Association football midfielders